Wilfrid Caithness or Wilfred Caithness (1883–1954) was a British stage and film actor. He played the role of Sebastian Moran in the 1935 film The Triumph of Sherlock Holmes.

Selected filmography
 A Voice Said Goodnight  (1932)
 The Lad (1935)
 The Triumph of Sherlock Holmes (1935)
 D'Ye Ken John Peel? (1935)
 Checkmate (1935)
 Spy of Napoleon (1936)
 The Man Behind the Mask (1936)
 The Improper Duchess (1936)
 The Perfect Crime (1937)
 Two for Danger (1940)
 My Sister and I (1948)
 Nothing Venture (1948)
 Brandy for the Parson (1952)

References

Bibliography
 Reid, John. HOLLYWOOD 'B' MOVIES: A Treasury of Spills, Chills & Thrills.

External links

1883 births
1954 deaths
Male actors from London
British male stage actors
British male film actors
People from Paddington